Benavides can refer to:

People
 Antonio José Benavides, Venezuelan Major General
 Benavides (singer), Venezuelan singer
 Brad Benavides, American-Spanish-Guatemalan racing driver
 César Benavides, Chilean Army general
 Freddie Benavides, American baseball player and coach
 Jesse Benavides, American former professional boxer
 Marta Benavides, Salvadoran activist
 Miguel de Benavides, Spanish clergyman
 Óscar R. Benavides, 20th century Peruvian president
 Osvaldo Benavides, Mexican actor and filmmaker
 Patricia Benavides, Peruvian lawyer
 Plácido Benavides (1810–1837) Mexican-born settler in De Leon's Colony, Victoria County, Texas.
 Prudencio Benavides, Cuban baseball player
 Ramiro Benavides, Bolivian former professional tennis player
 Roque Benavides, Peruvian businessman
 Santos Benavides, Confederate colonel
Ismael Benavides Ferreyros, Peruvian politician

Places
 Benavides, Texas
 Benavides, León in Spain

Business
 Farmacias Benavides